Cusseta may refer to a place in the United States:

Cusseta, Creek Nation, a Muscogee Creek peace town formerly located in Georgia
Cusseta, Alabama
Cusseta, Georgia
Fort Cusseta